Bullis Charter School (BCS) is a public charter school in Los Altos, California, USA, for grades kindergarten through eighth. As the Santa Clara County Office of Education charters the school, BCS operates independently of the Los Altos School District (LASD). BCS provides full-time teaching specialists in the arts and sciences, a Mandarin language program, and optional after-school activities. The school is funded in approximately equal parts from state funding and parent donations.

History

BCS was founded by local residents as a reaction to the decision of 10 February 2003 by the Los Altos School District (LASD) Board to close Bullis Elementary School in Los Altos Hills (this school later re-opened as Gardner Bullis School in 2008).

Because of the nature of the school's origin, the background and motivation behind the school's creation are an important part of its history. The Los Altos School District ran a parcel tax campaign in 2002, Measure A, and indicated the money was necessary to maintain the current schools and their quality.  There was no mention of a school closure if the measure passed.  Within one week of achieving a 70% passing vote the LASD Board of Trustees began the process of selecting a school to close.  Many in the Los Altos Hills and University Avenue area of Los Altos felt betrayed by the District and its board.  It was this more than anything else that began the process of distrust and disengagement of many of these parents.  A citizen's committee from across the community was formed to select which school to close. From their perspective, the Los Altos Hills school was the smallest and easiest to close. The result was essentially three factions of disgruntled parents. One faction simply accepted what happened and moved on. Another faction worked with the District for several more years to re-open the closed school, which eventually succeeded five years after its original closure. A third faction opened Bullis Charter School.

After the school's original charter application was twice rejected by the local school district, the school is now chartered by the County of Santa Clara.

The school now resides in two locations shared with Egan Junior High School (K-8) and Blach Intermediate School (K-5).

The school exists alongside of the original school it was intended to replace and reportedly draws many more applications than spots that are available, although now only approximately 25% of the school's attendees reside in the attendance area of the temporarily closed school which this school was created to replace.

While many parents are apparently interested in the "alternate" approach of the school (as evidence from the school's application numbers which are reported by the school itself), many have raised questions for the need for this in a district which is already considered high performing. These approach methods often include long term projects, goal setting, and intersessions for the 7th and 8th grade.

Timeline

On September 3, 2003, the Santa Clara Office of Education approved the school charter and became the sponsoring agency of BCS.

On March 15, 2004, the LASD offered the portable classrooms at Egan Junior High School to BCS beginning on May 1, 2004. BCS accepted and has been there ever since.

On February 21, 2007, the Santa Clara County Board of Education approved the renewal of the BCS charter for five more years in a 6-0 vote.

On April 9, 2008, BCS was given a California Distinguished School Award.

In 2008, BCS was granted WASC Accreditation.

In November 2008, the Santa Clara County Board of Education ruled that BCS can add a 7th and 8th grade.

In August 2010, BCS opened its doors to their first ever 7th grade class.

Academic Performance & Recognition

Since its inception, BCS has consistently been among the highest-scoring charter schools in the state of California. By the end of 2006, BCS was also ranked among the top 1 percent of all schools in the state. BCS' Academic Performance Index (API) scores remained consistently near the top of the 1,000 point range. Although this is outstanding performance, this above average performance was also consistent with the surrounding public schools in Los Altos. The chart at right provides a comparison of Base API scores between BCS and the average of all schools within LASD.*

* Scores for the 2012-2013 school year represent the calculated Growth API due to the California Department of Education discontinuing the use of the API accountability system. API reports in subsequent years were not produced.

BCS has twice been named a California Distinguished School by the California Department of Education. Once in 2008 and again in 2014, this time for its signature STEAM (Science, Technology, Engineering, Art, and Math) program and personalized learning in the form of Focused Learning Goals (FLGs) for every student. BCS was also one of only fourteen schools in the state to be recognized for having an Exemplary Visual and Performing Arts program. Also in 2014, BCS was named a National Blue Ribbon School by the U.S. Department of Education. Following the statewide transition to new assessment and accountability systems, BCS was again recognized by the California Department of Education in 2016 as a California Gold Ribbon School.

Differentiation from Surrounding Public Schools
The school has full-time teaching specialists in the arts and sciences, and a Mandarin language program taught as a requirement from kindergarten onward, and a curriculum featuring co-curricular classes.

Unlike traditional public schools (and like other California public charter schools), anyone who resides in the state of California can choose to attend Bullis Charter School by submitting for enrollment. If there are more students interested than there are spots available, then, by law, there is a random public lottery to determine who is admitted. According to the school's enrollment procedures found on their website, enrollment preferences (which are authorized by the Santa Clara County Office of Education) are applied based on a prescribed hierarchy within each grade level. One such preference, specifically for those students residing in the attendance area for the original Bullis-Purissima Elementary School, was a source of some controversy as it was perceived as giving special priority to children from certain affluent parts of Los Altos and Los Altos Hills. This characterization does not reflect the original intent of the preference, however, which was to foster a greater sense of community.  Nonetheless, this preference was later changed as a part of a material revision to the school's charter (approved by the Santa Clara County Board of Directors on September 3, 2014). On May 6, 2021, Bullis Charter was threatened with closure unless it "cures" it's diversity issue.

References

External links
Official Bullis Charter School website
Bullis-Purissima Elementary School Foundation website
Santa Clara County Office of Education website
California Charter School Association website
Gardner Bullis School
Los Altos School District

Charter K–8 schools in California
Los Altos, California
Schools in Santa Clara County, California
2003 establishments in California